Marty Moore (born 1 March 1991) is an Irish rugby union player who plays tighthead prop for Ulster. He previously played for Leinster and Wasps, and has ten caps for Ireland.

Moore was educated at Castleknock College outside Dublin. He received summer coaching from the age of 14 from Leinster's Talent Identification Programme and went on tour with them to South Africa as a 16-year-old in 2007. He played for Leinster at schools, under-18 and under-19 level, and played for Ireland at under-18 level. He was part of the combined Leinster-Ulster team that played a combined Munster-Connacht side to inaugurate the Aviva Stadium in 2010. He joined the Leinster Academy, and made his senior debut in September 2012 against the Scarlets. He signed a development ahead of the 2013-14 season, during which he made 28 appearances, including 16 starts, and made his first five appearances for Ireland in the 2014 Six Nations Championship, all as a replacement. Five more appearances from the bench followed in the 2015 Six Nations Championship, but he missed the 2015 World Cup through injury.

He rejected a two-year contract extension with Leinster and on 25 January 2016 signed a deal with English Premiership side Wasps from the 2016–17 season. After two injury-interrupted seasons with Wasps, he signed for Ulster ahead of the 2018–19 season, hoping to be in consideration for more Ireland appearances. He made 20 appearances in his first season with Ulster, making 182 tackles with a 93% success rate, and was called up to an Ireland training squad in December 2019. He remained Ulster's leading tighthead the following season. In 2020–21 he made 23 appearances and made 162 tackles with a 92.49% success rate. In 2021–22 he has split time with Tom O'Toole for the tighthead position.

References

External links
Ulster Rugby profile
United Rugby Championship profile

Ireland profile
Leinster Profile
ESPN Profile
ItsRugby profile

Living people
1991 births
Lansdowne Football Club players
Leinster Rugby players
Ireland international rugby union players
Rugby union props
Wasps RFC players
Rugby union players from Dublin (city)
Ireland Wolfhounds international rugby union players
Ulster Rugby players
Irish rugby union players
Irish expatriate sportspeople in England
Expatriate rugby union players in England
Irish expatriate rugby union players